He Chengxiang (February 1900 – 23 July 1967), courtesy name Guzhou, also known as He Zhonghan and He Xiang, was a Chinese politician who served as director of the State Administration for Religious Affairs from 1954 to 1961.

Biography
He was born in Gong County, Sichuan, in February 1900, to a landlord family. He was the fourth of nine children. His father He Lizhong was a merchant. In 1917 he attended the Xuzhou Unity High School (now Yibin No. 1 High School). In 1923 he was accepted to the Shanghai University, where he joined the Communist Party of China in the next year.

In May 1925 he participated in the May Thirtieth Movement. In June 1926, he was proposed as secretary-general of the All-China Students' Federation (ACSF), a student organization under the leadership of the Communist Party. In the winter of 1926, he was appointed secretary-general of the Jiangsu and Zhejiang Provinces of the Communist Youth League. In March 1927 he was transferred to Wuhan, capital of Hubei province, as director of the Hubei Provincial Committee of the Communist Youth League. At the beginning of 1928, he was appointed secretary of Jiangsu Provincial Committee of the Communist Youth League. In June 1928 he was imprisoned in Longhua Prison. At the beginning of 1929, he was appointed secretary of Shunzhi Provincial Committee of the Communist Youth League. In September 1929 he was arrested by the Tianjin Gendarmerie Command. He was released in 1930. In 1931, he was sent to northeast China, where he was Communist Party Secretary of Manzhou Province. In the spring of 1935, he became director of the Organizational Department of the Central Bureau of the Communist Party of China. During the Second Sino-Japanese War, he worked in the Southern Bureau of the Central Committee of the Communist Party of China. During the Chinese Civil War, he was involved in the Chongqing negotiations.

After the establishment of the Communist State, he was appointed director of the State Administration for Religious Affairs. In 1961 he was transferred to northwest China's Gansu province, where he was vice-governor there.

In 1966, Mao Zedong launched the Cultural Revolution, Lin Biao and Kang Sheng slandered him as a "traitor". He was mistreated and tortured and then died in Lanzhou, capital of Gansu province, on September 23, 1967. He was rehabilitated in May 1979.

References

External links

1900 births
Politicians from Yibin
1967 deaths
People's Republic of China politicians from Sichuan
Chinese Communist Party politicians from Sichuan
People persecuted to death during the Cultural Revolution